Antoniozzi is an Italian surname. Notable people with the surname include:

Alfredo Antoniozzi (born 1956), Italian politician, son of Alfredo
Dario Antoniozzi (1923–2019), Italian politician

See also

Antoniazzi

Italian-language surnames
Patronymic surnames
Surnames from given names